Alima is an African feminine given name. Notable people with the name include:

Alima Boumediene-Thiery (born 1956), French politician
Alima Mahama (born 1957), Ghanaian lawyer and government official
Alima Moro (born 1983), Ghanaian football player

Feminine given names